Basselinia glabrata is a species of palm tree endemic to New Caledonia. It was formerly placed in the genus Alloschmidia.

References

Endemic flora of New Caledonia
glabrata
Taxa named by Odoardo Beccari
Taxonomy articles created by Polbot